The 2009 FIA Formula One World Championship was the 63rd season of FIA Formula One motor racing.

Jenson Button and Brawn GP secured the Drivers' Championship and Constructors' Championship titles, respectively, in the Brazilian Grand Prix, the penultimate race of the season. It was both Button and Brawn's first championship success, Brawn becoming the first team to win the Constructors' Championship in their debut season. Button was the tenth British driver to win the championship, and following Lewis Hamilton's success in 2008 it was the first time the championship had been won by English drivers in consecutive seasons, and the first time since Graham Hill (1968) and Jackie Stewart (1969) that consecutive championships had been won by British drivers. Also notable was the success of Red Bull Racing, as well as the poor performance of McLaren and Ferrari compared to the previous season.

Ten teams participated in the championship after several rule changes were implemented by the FIA to cut costs to try to minimise the financial difficulties. There were further changes to try to improve the on-track spectacle with the return of slick tyres, changes to aerodynamics and the introduction of kinetic energy recovery systems (KERS) presenting some of the biggest changes in Formula One regulations for several decades.

The Brawn team, formed as a result of a management buyout of the Honda team, won six of the first seven races, their ability to make the most of the new regulations being a deciding factor in the championship. Red Bull Racing caught up in an unpredictable second half of the season, with the season being the first time since  that all participating teams had scored World Championship points. Sebastian Vettel and Button's teammate Rubens Barrichello were his main challengers over the season, winning six races between them to finish in second and third, respectively.

Teams and drivers
The following teams and drivers competed in the 2009 FIA Formula One World Championship: Teams competed with tyres supplied by Bridgestone.

Free practice drivers
One constructor entered free practice only drivers over the course of the season.

Team changes 
Honda withdrew ahead of the 2009 season, and the team was bought by a consortium led by team principal Ross Brawn. Brawn renamed the team Brawn GP, and raced with Mercedes engines, but retained Honda drivers Jenson Button and Rubens Barrichello.

Driver changes 
The only offseason driver change was following the retirement of Red Bull's David Coulthard after 14 years in Formula One. He was replaced by Sebastian Vettel, who had raced for Toro Rosso in 2008. Vettel's seat at Toro Rosso was taken by the Swiss driver Sébastien Buemi, who was Red Bull's test driver in 2008.

Following the German Grand Prix, Toro Rosso's Sébastien Bourdais was dropped by the team, with Toro Rosso principal Franz Tost claiming that the partnership had not met his expectations. Bourdais was replaced by Jaime Alguersuari ahead of the Hungarian Grand Prix. Alguersuari had been racing in Formula Renault 3.5 Series in 2009, and had only signed a deal to replace Brendon Hartley as Toro Rosso's test driver two weeks prior. Bourdais was advised by counsel to file suit for breach of contract by Toro Rosso. Toro Rosso settled the matter with a $2.1 million payment to Bourdais to avoid litigation.

After sustaining an injury during qualifying for the Hungarian Grand Prix, Ferrari's Felipe Massa missed the remainder of the season. He was replaced for the next two races by Ferrari test driver Luca Badoer, but after Badoer failed to score a single point in his two races, Ferrari replaced him with Giancarlo Fisichella who had signed a deal to be a Ferrari test driver for 2010 and had driven for Force India throughout the 2009 season. Fisichella's seat at Force India was taken by Vitantonio Liuzzi, who was Force India's test driver.

Following the Hungarian Grand Prix, Renault parted ways with Nelson Piquet Jr. as he had failed to score a single point and allegations that he had intentionally crashed during the 2008 Singapore Grand Prix surfaced. Piquet was replaced by Romain Grosjean, who was Renault's test driver.

In qualifying for the Japanese Grand Prix, Toyota's Timo Glock crashed heavily at the last corner and was airlifted to hospital with a leg injury. As he was not fit to race, Jarno Trulli was the only driver representing Toyota at the Japanese Grand Prix. On 11 October, Toyota confirmed that its test driver Kamui Kobayashi would make his race debut in the Brazilian Grand Prix, as Glock had suffered further complications from his accident, resulting in a cracked vertebra and he would not be guaranteed to be fit in time to race in Brazil. Kobayashi retained the seat in the final race of the season in Abu Dhabi.

Season calendar

The following rounds were included on the provisional calendars published by the FIA but were cancelled:

Calendar changes
 The Chinese Grand Prix was brought forward from its October date to April to become the third round of the championship.
 Abu Dhabi made its first appearance on the F1 calendar under the name Abu Dhabi Grand Prix, with a race being held at the Yas Marina Circuit on Yas Island in Abu Dhabi on 1 November – the final round of the 2009 season.  That meant the Abu Dhabi Grand Prix was the new final round of the 2009 season.
 The Japanese Grand Prix changed circuits from the Fuji Speedway in Oyama to the Suzuka Circuit in Suzuka.
 The Canadian Grand Prix was originally scheduled for 7 June, but was cancelled due to lack of sponsors and contractual problems and was replaced by the Turkish Grand Prix; the Grand Prix returned the next year.
 The French Grand Prix was originally scheduled for 28 June at Circuit de Nevers Magny-Cours, but was cancelled due to the withdrawal of financial support by the government; the Grand Prix returned in 2018 at Circuit Paul Ricard.

Regulation changes

The FIA released preliminary technical regulations for the 2009 season on 22 December 2006, and these were revised several times to accommodate the findings of the Overtaking Working Group (formed in response to concerns that passing in wheel-to-wheel racing was becoming increasingly rare) and the increasing need for cost-cutting in the sport to minimise financial costs.

 Slick tyres returned for the first time since they were banned for the  season. Bridgestone continued to be the sole supplier of tyres, and drivers still had to use both compounds of tyre during a race. Further, wet tyres were renamed "intermediate" and extreme-weather tyres were renamed "wet".
 The aerodynamic regulations were radically altered for the 2009 season. The front wings were made lower and wider, while rear wings were changed to be higher and narrower. As well as the changes in the dimensions of the wings, bodywork became much more regulated with many of the additional components seen in previous seasons (including barge boards, winglets and turning vanes) removed, making 2009 cars noticeably different in appearance than in previous years. The diffuser at the rear of the car was moved back and upwards. Many other minor chassis components were also standardised. The aim of the new aerodynamic regulations, as well as the reintroduction of slick tyres, was to decrease reliance on aerodynamic downforce and increase mechanical grip with the aim of making wheel-to-wheel racing easier.
 For the first time, cars were allowed to use driver adjustable bodywork, in the form of adjustable flaps in the front wing. The flaps could be adjusted by up to six degrees, limited to only two adjustments per lap. Adjustable front wings were designed to improve downforce when following another car, another change designed to improve overtaking.
 Kinetic Energy Recovery Systems, a regenerative braking device designed to recover some of the vehicle's kinetic energy normally dissipated as heat during braking, were introduced for the 2009 season. The recovered energy can be stored electrically, in a battery or supercapacitor, or mechanically, in a flywheel, for use as a source of additional accelerative power at the driver's discretion by way of a boost button on the steering wheel. The systems were not made compulsory, and because of concerns about both limited performance gains and safety implications only four teams opted to use the system during the season.
 While the FIA were planning on introducing a budget cap to limit the amount of spending by Formula One teams in 2008, the amount was not agreed upon and the budget cap idea was dropped. Instead, costs were brought down by a complete ban on in-season testing, a forced reduction in wind tunnel usage, the sharing of more data during race weekends, an increased minimum engine lifespan and gearboxes had to last for four races, and a penalty of five places in the starting grid was applied, should a driver change it during the weekend before the start of the race.
 Each driver was limited to a maximum of eight engines throughout the season, in addition to four engines for practice/testing purposes; using additional engines resulted in a 10-place grid penalty for each additional engine used. To aid improvements in reliability, the engines were detuned from 19,000 RPM to 18,000 rpm.
 The rule stating that the pit lane is closed during a safety car period was scrapped in 2009. The rule was introduced in 2007 to prevent drivers rushing back to the pits to refuel, possibly speeding through a danger zone, but software was successfully developed to solve this problem.
 The FIA initially declared that the driver with the most wins at the end of the season would be the winner of the 2009 Formula One World Championship, but dropped the decision because of opposition from teams and drivers. Formula One Teams Association argued that FIA could not change the rules this close to the season's start without the full agreement of the teams. Other proposals rejected by FIA were the introduction of a new points system with the scale 12–9–7–5–4–3–2–1 and to award medals for first, second and third place.

Pre-season
FIA President Max Mosley announced dramatic rule changes for the 2009 season in a bid to improve the spectacle of the sport, with the cars undergoing major changes in an effort to increase overtaking. The design changes significantly altered the design of the cars, incorporating wider and lower front wings, taller and narrower rear wings, and a reduction on aerodynamic bodywork. Also introduced were slick tyres and Kinetic Energy Recovery Systems, as well as implementing cost-cutting measures in a response to the rising costs of competing.

Honda announced in December 2008 they would be leaving Formula One with immediate effect, as a result of the automotive industry crisis. After a winter of uncertainty, it was confirmed on 5 March 2009 that the team would compete in the 2009 season as Brawn GP, with Mercedes engines, following a management buyout led by team principal Ross Brawn, and would retain the services of both Jenson Button and Rubens Barrichello as drivers. Anthony Davidson, who competed for the Honda-backed Super Aguri team before their early withdrawal in 2008, joined Brawn as a test driver.

Force India joined Brawn GP in using the Mercedes engines by signing a five-year deal until 2013, having ended their previous supply contract from Ferrari. The retirement of Red Bull Racing driver David Coulthard led to the appointment of Sebastian Vettel as his replacement, who left the Scuderia Toro Rosso team after a successful previous season including winning the Italian Grand Prix. Toro Rosso, a team designed to develop new Formula One drivers, saw co-owner Gerhard Berger sell his half-stake back to Red Bull, claiming that the new regulations would "leave no room for improvement for a small team like STR", Franz Tost took over as team boss. Filling Vettel's race seat in Toro Rosso was Sébastien Buemi, who as part of the Red Bull Junior Team competed for Trust Team Arden in the GP2 Series.

The World Drivers' Championship would be decided in the traditional manner of points scored after Bernie Ecclestone's idea that the driver who won the most races be declared as the champion was scrapped following protests from the Formula One Teams Association. The teams were less successful in their attempts to have the long-running French and Canadian Grands Prix kept on the calendar, with the organisers of both events pulling out due to financial issues. The Abu Dhabi Grand Prix made its début appearance as the last round of the season, at the Hermann Tilke-designed Yas Marina Circuit. The race, starting at sunset, was Formula One's first day-night race.

The first multi-team testing session took place at Circuit de Catalunya, Barcelona in November 2008, two weeks after the end of previous season. All teams, except Toyota, took part in the testing session where some teams tested their new aerodynamics package and slick tyres. The new look cars did not suit everyone's taste, with BMW Sauber's test driver, Christian Klien, labelling the car the ugliest car he'd ever seen. On 9 March, testing at Barcelona featured for the first time Brawn GP, who made an immediate impact by leading the times early in the day. The test, the first in which all teams used their 2009 cars, had BMW Sauber leading the times while Brawn GP finished fourth. On day three, Brawn GP's Jenson Button was fastest by just over one second to Ferrari's Felipe Massa, while Button's teammate Rubens Barrichello went even faster the next day. At the other end of the timing sheets, reigning champion Lewis Hamilton's McLaren team were struggling to adapt to the new regulations, often 1.5 seconds off the pace. Massa stated he had never seen McLaren so far behind.

A major source of controversy throughout the winter season were the rear diffusers. Three teams – Toyota, Williams and Brawn GP – launched their cars with a diffuser that uses the rear crash structure in order to generate additional downforce, labelled "double diffusers". These designs were quickly protested, and just days after the cars were unveiled, rival teams asked the FIA for a clarification on the matter.

On the Wednesday of the season opening race in Australia, an official complaint was launched by the seven other teams against the rear diffusers of the Williams FW31, Toyota TF109 and the Brawn BGP 001 saying that they were illegal. The FIA scrutineers disagreed, declaring the cars legal.

Testing

The first testing held by Bahrain International Circuit, Bahrain in 16–19 February, and second and final testing held by Circuit de Barcelona-Catalunya, Spain in 9–12 March.

Report

Red Bull's Sebastian Vettel had been running in second until he collided with BMW Sauber's Robert Kubica. The accident meant the race finished behind the safety car, with Toyota's Jarno Trulli eventually classified third despite McLaren's false protest he had illegally overtaken Lewis Hamilton. Reigning champion Hamilton was disqualified from the Australian race for lying to the stewards and at the following Malaysian Grand Prix there were reports he was on the verge of quitting. The race was equally dramatic, being stopped because of monsoon-like conditions, meaning only half points were awarded for only the fifth time in F1 history. Button mastered the changing conditions for his second win, while quick starting Nico Rosberg dropped to eighth when the race was stopped. In the interval between races, the controversial double diffusers, used by Brawn, Williams and Toyota, were declared legal by the FIA, ending the fight over their use. The Chinese race also took place in wet conditions, with the rain throughout the duration of the race necessitating a safety car start and causing several accidents. Vettel led teammate Mark Webber to Red Bull's first win in Formula One, ahead of the two Brawns and McLarens.

Dry conditions at Bahrain saw the Toyota team gain the front of the grid, but Button managed to fight up from a fourth-place start, and overtook race leader Timo Glock on his first pit stop. Hamilton and Räikkönen, in fourth and sixth respectively, gave their  championship winning teams the best finishes of a disappointing season start. The  was a battle between the Brawn teammates, with Barrichello getting ahead of polesitter Button while a first lap incident forced the retirement of four drivers. Button followed a different pit-stop strategy and passed Barrichello during his stop, leading Brawn's second one-two of the season. Red Bull was the closest team to Brawn finishing third and fourth, while Felipe Massa's fuel shortage lost him places as he slowed to finish the race. Button won in dominant fashion at Monaco, leading the majority of the race from pole position ahead of his teammate Barrichello and Räikkönen, who scored Ferrari's first podium in 2009. At the  Vettel started on pole but lost the position to Button on the first lap. Button went on to win, followed by Webber and a closely pursuing Vettel. Barrichello's car developed a gearbox problem, and incidents with Heikki Kovalainen and Adrian Sutil resulted in  Brawn's first retirement of the season. By winning six out of the first seven races, Button had opened up a 26-point lead on his teammate, with Vettel a further six points behind.

The British Grand Prix was seen as a turning point, being dominated by Red Bull with Vettel leading home Webber, in dry conditions. Button was not on the podium for the first time this season, finishing sixth. Red Bull also dominated the following German Grand Prix with Webber taking his first pole and race win, despite being given a drive through penalty. Ferrari were also showing signs of improvement, Felipe Massa finishing third in what would be his final race of the season. He was hospitalised after being hit on the helmet by a flying spring when he was travelling at 162 mph in qualifying for the Hungarian Grand Prix. The accident overshadowed the race, with a lightly fueled Fernando Alonso on pole retiring early in the race, which was won by Lewis Hamilton. Jaime Alguersuari finished his début race ahead of Buemi, the Toro Rosso test driver replacing the fired Sébastien Bourdais. Post-race, the Renault team received a suspension for the European Grand Prix, for an incident where Alonso's tyre came loose on the race track following a pit-stop error. An appeal overturned the decision, and the team raced in Valencia.

During the summer break, BMW Sauber announced their withdrawal from Formula One racing due to poor results and lack of financial sustainability. The team would compete until the end of the season, while BMW attempted to sell the organisation. Seven-time champion Michael Schumacher was originally set to replace the injured Massa, but the seat was taken by test driver Luca Badoer due to Schumacher's neck injuries. Also replaced was Renault driver Nelson Piquet Jr., who complained of unfair treatment by team management, in favour of GP2 driver Romain Grosjean.

The  in Valencia provided the first win for Rubens Barrichello after Hamilton lost the lead with an error in the pits; he finished second while both Red Bulls failed to score. At the  Giancarlo Fisichella gained Force India's first pole position, and his second-place finish behind Kimi Räikkönen gave their first points. Button's title charge was undermined by poor qualifying and a crash, involving him, Hamilton, Alguersuari and Grosjean, ending their races. Following the race Badoer, who had qualified and finished last in both races, was replaced with Giancarlo Fisichella after his performance at the Belgian race. Vitantonio Liuzzi in turn took the vacant Force India drive. Brawn returned to form in Italy, with Barrichello leading home the team's fourth 1–2 of the season. Lewis Hamilton crashed on the penultimate lap, but came back by winning the next race at Singapore. Webber's crash ended his chance of winning the championship. Toyota teammate Glock was injured during qualifying, and a cracked vertebra meant he was replaced by reserve Kamui Kobayashi for the final two races.

The Drivers' and Constructors' championships were both decided at the penultimate race in Brazil. Storm-affected qualifying at Interlagos gave Barrichello pole during Formula One's longest qualifying session, while title rivals Button and Vettel started from 14th and 16th respectively. During the first lap, three incidents led to the retirement of three cars and a fire in the pit-lane, with Button taking advantage to move up the grid. Button fought up to fifth position by the race end, securing enough points to clinch the title. Mark Webber took the lead after Barrichello pitted and won the race, followed by Robert Kubica, to give BMW Sauber their joint best result of their final season and his only podium result in 2009. Lewis Hamilton completed the top three after starting 17th on the grid, moving him and McLaren above Kimi Räikkönen and Ferrari respectively in the championships. The inaugural Abu Dhabi Grand Prix, taking place at sunset, rounded out the season, with another win for Vettel and Red Bull's fourth 1–2 result of the year, awarding Vettel and the team second place in both championships.

2008 race fixing controversy

In a scandal dubbed "Crashgate" by the media, allegations of race-fixing during the 2008 Singapore Grand Prix emerged during the second half of the 2009 season from former Renault driver Nelson Piquet Jr. Over the course of the 2009 Belgian Grand Prix, Piquet, who had been sacked weeks earlier by Renault, claimed he was asked to crash at the Singapore race in a strategy designed to aid teammate and eventual race winner Fernando Alonso. Renault were handed a two-year suspended ban from the sport after the FIA World Motor Sport Council decided the team's managing director, Flavio Briatore and its executive director of engineering, Pat Symonds had asked Piquet to crash. Both had left the team before the WMSC hearing, where they were given life and five-year suspensions respectively. It had been rumoured Renault were prepared to quit the sport at the end of the 2009 season had the team been heavily punished, but the FIA found Briatore and Symonds solely to blame and chose to suspend Renault's ban.

Results and standings

Grands Prix

Scoring system

Points were awarded to the top eight classified finishers.

If two or more competitors had the same number of points (including 0 points), their positions in the championship were fixed according to the quality of their places. Under this system one first place was better than any number of second places, one second place was better than any number of third places, and so on.

World Drivers' Championship standings

Notes:
 – Driver did not finish the Grand Prix, but was classified as he completed more than 90% of the race distance.

World Constructors' Championship standings

Notes:
 – Driver did not finish the Grand Prix, but was classified as he completed more than 90% of the race distance.

Notes

References

External links

 
 Official Formula One website
 formula1.com – 2009 official driver standings
 formula1.com – 2009 official team standings
 2009 FIA Formula One World Championship Classifications as archived at web.archive.org

 
Formula One seasons
Formula 1